KSBJ is a non-commercial Contemporary Christian music radio station based in Humble, Texas, broadcasting on 89.3 MHz FM in the Greater Houston area. KSBJ is owned and operated by Hope Media Group (formerly KSBJ Educational Foundation).

KSBJ is a non-profit ministry supported by listeners and is led by a diverse board of directors from across the greater Houston area.  KSBJ can be heard online at KSBJ.org, through the KSBJ app, on 89.3 FM (Greater Houston Area), 96.9 FM (South/West of Houston), 99.9 (Beaumont/Liberty), 92.3 (Livingston), 92.5 (Navasota/College Station), 89.7 (Brenham) and 99.9 (Victoria).

KSBJ Educational Foundation also operates NGEN Radio, which is an online-exclusive Christian hip-hop and pop format, and the Spanish-language Vida Unida Christian AC format, which originates from sister station KHVU.

History
KSBJ signed on the air July 8, 1982, with Buddy Holiday at the helm. It began life as a Christian Rock station, but moved toward the current Contemporary Christian and Worship format early on. KSBJ originally operated at 88.1 MHz, but changed frequency to the current 89.3 MHz in 1987, as a part of a frequency switch with then KFTG in Santa Fe.

KSBJ's 1982 sign on began with Dallas Holm's song "Rise Again," both as a sign of a completed blessing (the same song was played months earlier on KFMK radio as it signed off as a Christian station), and in celebration of God's work continuing in Houston.

Over the years, KSBJ has expanded its ministry exponentially. It first acquired low power translators in order to cover more potential listeners in areas outside of the main KSBJ signal range, then acquired full power facilities, beginning with KIOX-FM in El Campo.

On September 1, 2017, KSBJ filed a minor modification to move the signal from its longtime transmission site near Splendora, Texas to its current site in North Houston. The ERP was lowered from the maximum 100 kilowatts to the current 87 kilowatts, as well as a decrease in height above average terrain. While this greatly improved the signal in Houston itself, as well as the immediate suburbs in Harris County, KSBJ was all but lost in areas such as Livingston, Beaumont, and Huntsville, Texas. This was remedied with the purchase of KETX-FM and KSHN during the summer of 2019, returning KSBJ programming to areas lost in the move of the main signal, plus areas that KSBJ had little to no previous reach.

In 2020, KSBJ launched the website Hope on Demand.

References

External links

89.3 FM KSBJ & NGEN Radio" live internet streams
National Religious Broadcasts
KSBJ's Port Lavaca Construction Permit
Listing of Stations Broadcasting KSBJ
 

Radio stations established in 1982
1982 establishments in Texas
SBJ